Akra may refer to:

Places
Acra (fortress), a Seleucid fortress in Jerusalem
Akra, hamlet in Greene County (see Cairo, New York) where Jack "Legs" Diamond is rumored to have had a home
Akra, Bannu, an archaeological site south of Peshawar in Pakistan
Akra, Maheshtala, South 24 Parganas, West Bengal, India
Akra railway station
Akra Peninsula, a peninsula in Antarctica
Akra Township, Pembina County, North Dakota, a township in North Dakota, USA
 Akra Leuke, ancient city founded by Greeks, modern Alicante, Spain
 Akra, Crimea, a submerged ancient Greek city in Crimea

People
Yasser Akra (born 1985), Syrian footballer

See also
Aakra or Åkra (disambiguation)
Accra, the capital of Ghana
Acra (disambiguation)
Acre (disambiguation)
Akre (disambiguation)
Aqra (disambiguation)